Brotherlee is a small village in County Durham, England situated on the south side of Weardale, between Stanhope and Daddry Shield.

External links

Villages in County Durham
Stanhope, County Durham